The following table lists the ranks and insignia of officers in NATO air forces.

Officers (OF 1 - 10)

 1 Honorary/War time rank.

Note that the NATO officer rank codes (OF-1 to OF-10) are differently numbered from the US officer rank codes (O-1 to O-10).

See also
 NATO
 Ranks and insignia of NATO
 Ranks and insignia of NATO armies enlisted
 Ranks and insignia of NATO armies officers
 Ranks and insignia of NATO air forces enlisted
 Ranks and insignia of NATO navies enlisted
 Ranks and insignia of NATO navies officers

Notes

References

External links 
History of NATO – the Atlantic Alliance—UK Government site

Military ranks of NATO
Air force ranks